The Roman Catholic Diocese of Carolina is a suffragan diocese in the Ecclesiastical province of São Luís do Maranhão in northeastern Brazil's Maranhão state.

Its cathedral episcopal see is Catedral São Pedro de Alcântara, dedicated to Saint Peter of Alcantara, in the city of Carolina, Maranhão.

History 
 14 January 1958: Established as Territorial Prelature of Carolina, on territory split off from the Diocese of Rio Preto
 16 October 1979: Promoted as Diocese of Carolina
 Lost territory on 1987.06.27 to establish Diocese of Imperatriz

Statistics 
As per 2015, it pastorally served 158,100 Catholics (89.9% of 175,800 total) on 18,252 km² in 11 parishes and 1 mission with 12 priests (diocesan), 2 lay religious (2 sisters) and 4 seminarians.

Bishops
(all Roman Rite)

Episcopal ordinaries
Territorial Bishop-Prelates of Carolina  
 Cesário Alexandre Minali, O.F.M.Cap. (born Italy) (1958.04.09 – death 1969.06.13), Titular Bishop of Achyraus (1955.03.01 – 1969.06.13), previously Bishop-Prelate of Territorial Prelature of Alto Solimões (Brazil) (1955.03.01 – 1958.04.09)
 Marcelino Sérgio Bicego, O.F.M.Cap. (first native incumbent) (1971.08.06 – 1979.10.16 see below), Titular Bishop of Lydda (1971.08.06 – 1978.05.26)

Suffragan Bishops of Carolina 
 Marcelino Sérgio Bicego, O.F.M.Cap. (see above 1979.10.16 – death 1980.01.22)
 Evangelista Alcimar Caldas Magalhães, O.F.M. Cap. (1981.09.03 – 1990.09.12), next Prelate (later Bishop) of Alto Solimões (Brazil) (1990.09.12 – retired 2015.05.20)
 Marcelino Correr, O.F.M.Cap. (1991.03.13 – retired 2003.10.15), died 2006
 José Soares Filho, O.F.M.Cap. (2003.10.15 – retired 2017.07.05), also Apostolic Administrator of Diocese of Tocantinópolis (Brazil) (2008.01 – 2009.03.04); succeeded as previous Coadjutor Bishop of Carolina (2003.01.15 – 2003.10.15)
 Francisco Lima Soares (2018.11.21 -)

Coadjutor bishop
José Soares Filho, O.F.M. Cap. (2003)

See also 
 List of Catholic dioceses in Brazil

Sources and external links 
 GCatholic.org - data for all sections
 Catholic Hierarchy

Roman Catholic dioceses in Brazil
Religious organizations established in 1958
Roman Catholic Ecclesiastical Province of São Luís do Maranhão
Roman Catholic dioceses and prelatures established in the 20th century
1958 establishments in Brazil